Mykola Ivanovych Kucher   (born 24 August 1959) is a Ukrainian politician and entrepreneur currently serving as a People's Deputy of Ukraine since 26 November 2014.

Education 
In 1981 he graduated from the Ukrainian Agricultural Academy with a degree in agronomy.

Career 
 1981 – the main agronomist of collective farm,  village, Trostianets Raion
 1989–1992 – chair of Trostianets regional agro-industrial corporation
 1992–1994 – director of agricultural and food management of Trostianets regional administration
 1994–1995 – deputy manager of agriculture and food management of Vinnytsia Oblast government 
 1995–1999 – Head of Department managing Vinnytsia oblast administration
 1999–2000 – Head of Department deputy manager Ukraine's Bread (Kyiv)
 2000–2002 – first deputy manager Bread of Ukraine 
 2002–2004 – Chairman of the board of directors of Bread of Ukraine  
 2004–2013 – director of Grain Product MHP
 Since 2013 — Department director Mironivsky Hliboproduct

Political career 
 Since 2010 — Deputy of Vinnytsia Oblast Council (Ukrainian People's Party).
In the 2014 Ukrainian parliamentary election Kucher won electoral district № 17 (Vinnytsia Oblast) as an independent candidate with 47.64%..
 27 November 2014– — member of the Verkhovna Rada Committee on agriculture policy and land relations and member of faction of the Petro Poroshenko Bloc "Solidarity"

In the 2019 Ukrainian parliamentary election Kucher was re-elected in single-seat constituency 17 again as an independent candidate with 34.97% of the votes.

In December 2018, he sent a request–the court–take on bail the former acting Myroslav Prodan, head of the Fiscal Service of Ukraine (suspected of illegal enrichment of UAH 89 million in 2016–2018).

Private life  
He is married, with two children. In the 2019 Ukrainian parliamentary election Kucher's daughter Larysa Bilozir was elected in single-seat constituency 15.

Recognition 
 A Candidate of Agricultural Science (Ukraine)
 Honoured Agricultural Worker of Ukraine
 Order of Merit, Class III (Ukraine)

References

External links
 Parliament of Ukraine, official web portal

1959 births
Living people
21st-century Ukrainian businesspeople
People from Vinnytsia Oblast
National University of Life and Environmental Sciences of Ukraine alumni
Independent politicians of Petro Poroshenko Bloc
Ukrainian People's Party politicians
Eighth convocation members of the Verkhovna Rada
Ninth convocation members of the Verkhovna Rada
21st-century Ukrainian politicians
Recipients of the Order of Merit (Ukraine), 3rd class